Ezhamkulam  is a village in Adoor Thaluk of Pathanamthitta district in the state of Kerala, India. It is located about 5 km from central Adoor.

Culture

Ezhamkulam is known for the ancient Ezhamkulam Devi Temple. It is famous for Garudan Thookkam, vazhipadu thookkam and Kettukazhcha that take place as a part of the annual Kumbha Bharani festival.

Demographics
At the 2001 India census, Ezhamkulam had a population of 18,884 with 9,017 males and 9,867 females.

See also
Pathanamthitta
Adoor
Parakode
Temples of Kerala

References

External links
Ezhamkulam Temple
Official website from the Govt. of Kerala
Official website of Pathanamthitta district

Villages in Pathanamthitta district